Paul Gicheru Njoroge wasa Kenyan lawyer and qualified advocate of the High Court (Kenya) who was accused by Hague-based International Criminal Court of bribing and intimidating witnesses in a case against the now Kenyan President William Ruto, and journalist Joshua Sang that was dismissed in 2016. He faced six counts of bribery and corruptly inducing witnesses to interfere with justice. He was found dead in his house in Karen,  Nairobi on 26 September 2022.

Career
Gicheru began his career at Kalya and Company Advocates in Eldoret before proceeding to open his own - Gicheru and Company Advocates in the same town. In 2014 he was appointed by the head of Kenya's National Treasury Henry Rotich to head the Public Procurement Review Board for two years.

Hague Case
In March 2010, ICC's Pre-trial chamber II opened an investigation into the political violence that occurred in Kenya after the 2007 Kenyan general election. A letter of arrest for Gicheru and one Philip Kipkoech Bett was issued five years later on 10 Mar. 2015 and unsealed on 10 Sep. 2015.

Gicheru surrendered to the ICC five years later on 2 Nov. 2020 to the Netherlands authorities to answer to the alleged charges of corruptly influencing witnesses of the court. His initial appearance was on 6 Nov. 2020. 

On 11 December 2020 the pre-trial chamber severed the cases against Gicheru and Philip Kipkoech Bett. On 1 Feb. 2021 Gicheru was released to Kenya with specific conditions restricting liberty. On 15 July 2021, ICC pre-trial Chamber A confirmed the charges of offenses.  

The opening of the trial was on 15 Feb. 2022 before single judge Miatta Maria Samba. He pleaded not guilty to the charges and the closing statements to the case were made on 27 June 2022.

Death
Gicheru died on 26 September 2022 in Nairobi while awaiting a decision from the chamber on whether he was responsible for the scheme to interfere with the ICC case, or not. He was laid to rest on Thursday, 6 October 2022 at his farm in Kwa Nguku, Bahati sub-county in Nakuru County.

Education
Gicheru schooled at Kasabet Boys between 1987 and 1990 before proceeding to the University of Nairobi to pursue a Bachelor of Law degree. He held a Post Graduate Diploma from Kenya School of Law.

References

External links
 Paul Gicheru Biography, Age, Education, Career and ICC Arrest Warrant at Who Owns Kenya
 Paul Gicheru At Africa Confidential

1972 births
2022 deaths
University of Nairobi alumni
21st-century Kenyan lawyers
People from Nandi County